Katia Buffetrille is a French ethnologist and tibetologist. She works at the École pratique des hautes études (EPHE 5th section). Her doctoral thesis is entitled Montagnes sacrées, lacs et grottes : lieux de pèlerinage dans le monde tibétain. Traditions écrites. Réalités vivantes (thesis national number: 1996PA100065). She has done fieldwork in Tibet and Nepal, researching pilgrimage, non-Buddhist beliefs, and sacred geography.

She is in charge of a seminar on rituals at the CRCAO (Centre de recherches sur les civilisations de l'Asie orientale; UMR 8155) and is editor of the journal Études mongoles, sibériennes, centrasiatiques et tibétaines (EMSCAT).

Works

 

 1998: Tibétains, 1959-1999, quarante ans de colonisation, with Charles Ramble; Volume 108 of Autrement: Collection Monde,  
 2000: Pèlerins, lamas et visionnaires. Sources orales et écrites sur les pèlerinages tibétains coll. Arbeitskreis für Tibetische und Buddhistische Studien Universität Wien.
 2002: Le Tibet est-il chinois ? with Anne-Marie Blondeau and Wei Jing,  Paris: Albin Michel,  Sciences des religions.
 2002: Tibet, jours de fêtes, with Eric Lobo, Published by Romain Pagès. 
 2008: Authenticating Tibet: Answers to China's One-Hundred Questions with Anne-Marie Blondeau (as editors), University of California Press, Berkeley. (Adapted and updated translation of Le Tibet est-il chinois ? 
 2012: Revisiting rituals in a changing Tibetan context (ed.). Leiden: Brill, 2012.

External links
Katia Buffetrille (EPHE)

Tibetologists
French ethnologists
Academic staff of the University of Paris
Academic staff of the École pratique des hautes études
1948 births
Living people